State Road 685 (SR 685) is mainly a north–south highway in Tampa, Florida. From Dale Mabry Highway in South Tampa, the route follows Henderson Boulevard northeasterly for roughly one mile to Kennedy Blvd/SR 60. The remainder of the route is unsigned, but the hidden designation follows Kennedy Boulevard eastward to U.S. Route 41 Business (US 41 Bus.), at which point it turns north and becomes that highway's secret designation for just over  until the merge with US 41 near Lutz.

Major intersections

References

External links

Florida Route Log (SR 685)

685
685
685